Centre-Ouest Department was a department of Ivory Coast between 1963 and 1969. It was established in 1963 as a split-off from Sud-Ouest Department. During Centre-Ouest Department's existence, departments were the first-level administrative subdivisions of Ivory Coast.

Using current boundaries as a reference, the territory of Centre-Ouest Department was composed of Haut-Sassandra Region, Gôh Region, and Nawa Region.

In 1969, Centre-Ouest Department and the other five existing departments of the country were abolished and replaced with 24 new departments. The territory of Centre-Ouest Department became the new departments of Daloa, Gagnoa, and Sassandra.

Notes

References
"Districts of Côte d'Ivoire (Ivory Coast)", statoids.com, accessed 17 February 2016.

Former departments of Ivory Coast
1963 establishments in Ivory Coast
1969 disestablishments in Ivory Coast
States and territories established in 1963
States and territories disestablished in 1969